Ma. Elenita Milagros Ramos Ermita-Buhain (born May 12, 1969), more commonly known as Eileen Ermita-Buhain, is a Filipino politician who served as a member of the House of Representatives of the Philippines, representing the 1st district of Batangas from 2013 to 2022 and previously from 2001 to 2010. She is a member of the Nacionalista Party.

Ermita-Buhain is married to the swimmer and former Olympian Eric Buhain, incumbent representative of the 1st district of Batangas and former chairman of the Games and Amusement Board. She is the daughter of Eduardo Ermita, who served as the Executive Secretary under President Gloria Macapagal Arroyo from 2004 to 2010.

References
 
 

People from Batangas
De La Salle University alumni
1969 births
Living people
Lakas–CMD (1991) politicians
Lakas–CMD politicians
Nacionalista Party politicians
Members of the House of Representatives of the Philippines from Batangas
Women members of the House of Representatives of the Philippines